Calosoma catenatum is a species of ground beetle in the family Carabidae. It is found in Kenya.

Subspecies
These two subspecies belong to the species Calosoma catenatum:
 Calosoma catenatum catenatum (Roeschke, 1899)
 Calosoma catenatum kenyicola (Jeannel, 1940)

References

Calosoma